Malaysiaku Gemilang (Malay: My Glorious Malaysia) is a Malaysian patriotic song and it is also the anthem of the 50th Merdeka Day celebrations of 2007.

Lyric

References

External links
   A video of the song with photos of Malaysia and English subtitles
 https://www.youtube.com/watch?v=ASs2vzNxyWc

Malaysian patriotic songs
Malaysian culture
Malay-language songs